Hemlock and After is a 1952 novel by British writer Angus Wilson; it was his first published novel after a series of short stories. The novel offers a candid portrayal of gay life in post-World War II England.

Plot introduction

Bernard Sands, a prominent writer who has been given financial aid to start a writer's colony at Vardon Hall, faces a failing marriage, attempts to come to grips with his homosexuality and lives next door to a procuress for paedophiles.

Characters in Hemlock and After
 Bernard Sands, the protagonist; a homosexual.
 Ella, Bernard's wife.
 Elizabeth, the Sandses' daughter.
 James, the Sandses' son.
 Charles, a friend of Bernard's; a senior civil servant.
 Mrs Curry, the Sands's neighbour; a procuress for pedophiles.
 Hubert Rose, an architect and a pedophile.

References to other works
 Angus Wilson said in an interview that the ending of the novel was Dickensian.

Trivia
The novel was written in only four weeks.

References

External links
 Review from Time Magazine, 29 September 1952.

1952 British novels
Novels by Angus Wilson
British LGBT novels
Secker & Warburg books
Novels with gay themes
1950s LGBT novels
1952 debut novels